The Milan Biennial III was the third edition of the Monza Biennial, and the last to focus on ceramics, graphic and the decorative arts, before expanding scope to include architecture. This, and the other 3 biennials, were organised by the Istituto Superiore per le Industrie Artistiche (ISIA) to provide an arts vision for the new Kingdom of Italy. It was called the International Exhibition of Decorative Arts.

It was held in Monza at the Royal Villa of Monza, and ran from 
31 May to 16 

October 1927.

After 4 biennials the timing was changed to every three years to form the Milan Triennials.

References 

1927 in Italy
Monza
World's fairs in Italy